Radda Vyacheslavovna Novikova is a Russian film and television director (born on 25 October 1974). Novikova is well known for directing comedy television series Girls with Makarov, Interns, Two Fathers, Two Sons.

Life and career
Radda Novikova received her directing education in Moscow - in 1994 she graduated from the directing department of the VGIK. 

In 2003 she directed the two-part television film Story of the Spring Call.

From 2004 to 2006 she was the director of Inexplicable, yet a Fact (TNT), Out of Law (Channel One), Love Stories (for Channel One), Price of Love, Affair (for TNT).

In 2011 Novikova joined the directing team of the fourth season of medical sitcom Interns. The long-running series starred Ivan Okhlobystin as the cynical chief of staff.

Radda Novikova started working on the sitcom television series Two Fathers, Two Sons starring Dmitry Nagiyev in 2012.

In 2018 she directed comedic police procedural TV series Cop starring Kirill Zaytsev. The series was about an American police officer who comes to Russia to work.

In 2019 Novikova directed the short film Dark like the Night. Karenina-2019 - loosely based on Leo Tolstoy's Anna Karenina. The screenplay was written by Aleksandr Tsypkin.

In 2020 Novikova began directing comedy webseries Notes of the Helvetia Hotelier for Okko. The series has been greenlit for the second season.

In 2022 Novikova started directing the second season of Girls with Makarov, a police procedural sitcom starring Pavel Maykov. The third season of the series has started shooting and will also be directed by her.

Awards
Radda Novikova's Dark like the Night. Karenina-2019 received Best Music Video award at the Prague Independent Film Festival, and also received Best Short Film and Best Supporting Actor (Konstantin Khabensky) awards at the Vienna Independent Film Festival in 2019.

Filmography

TV
Girls with Makarov (2022-present)
Triada (2021)
Cop (2019)
Secretary (2018)
Two Fathers, Two Sons (2013)
Interns (2011-2013)
The Xe Men (2011)

Webseries
Notes of the Helvetia Hotelier (2020-present)

Feature films
Story of the Spring Call (2003)

Short films
Moscow Slide (2021)
Dark like the Night. Karenina-2019 (2019)

References

External links

Russian film directors
1974 births
Mass media people from Moscow
Living people
Russian women film directors